The 1985–86 UTEP Miners men's basketball team represented the University of Texas at El Paso in the 1985–86 college basketball season. The team was led by head coach Don Haskins. The Miners finished 26–7 (12–4 in WAC), won the conference tournament title, and reached the NCAA tournament.

Roster

Schedule and results

|-
!colspan=9 style=| Non-conference Regular Season

|-
!colspan=9 style=| WAC Regular Season

|-
!colspan=9 style=| WAC tournament

|-
!colspan=9 style=| NCAA tournament

Rankings

NBA Draft

References

UTEP Miners men's basketball seasons
Utep
Utep